The Battle of Ourique took place on 25 July 1139, in which the forces of Portuguese count Afonso Henriques (of the House of Burgundy) defeated those led by the Almoravid governor of Córdoba, Muhammad Az-Zubayr Ibn Umar, identified as "King Ismar" in Christian chronicles.

Background
Learning that during his Battle of Valdevez against Alfonso VII of León, Muslim forces had attacked and destroyed Leiria and Trancoso. Afonso Henriques's anxiety at this incursion at his southern frontier hastened his negotiations with Alfonso VII of León, leading to the Treaty of Zamora and freeing Afonso Henriques's troops to deal with the Muslim attack.

Battle

Historians are divided as to the location of this battle. At the time, the name "Ourique" designated a large area south of Beja. Since 12th-century chroniclers were unfamiliar with the region where the battle took place, they might have decided to call the location "field of Ourique" for lack of a more precise term. Nonetheless, the great distance that separated Ourique from the Christian lines farther north has led some historians to suggest various localities in central Portugal, abandoning the traditional idea that the combat occurred in Ourique in the Alentejo. It would have been difficult for the then Count of Portugal, with a realm little beyond the Mondego River, to go all the way south to battle five Muslim kings.

However, incursions by Christian armies deep in Muslim territory were not unheard of. Alfonso VII had directed expeditions that had reached Cordoba and Seville, well beyond the limits of Castillian dominions, and in 1147 he managed to conquer the Mediterranean port of Almería, south of Granada. This was possible because the largest Almoravid armies were positioned at the frontier, while armies stationed in small towns would rather retreat into their castles than face a strong enemy force. It is feasible that Afonso led a raid into the Gharb, and then, while retreating, was intercepted by a sizable Almoravid force intending to crush his army and recover the spoils taken by the Portuguese.

Before the battle, Count Afonso was hailed as rex (king) by his men in the Germanic fashion, by being lifted atop his shield by the leading nobles of Portugal.

Despite the fact that the Christian Portuguese forces were strongly outnumbered, the Muslim armies were weakened by internal leadership problems, which led to Afonso Henriques's victory and subsequently his proclamation as King of the Portuguese, as Afonso I, with the support from his troops, vanquishing and slaying, so legend says, five Muslim kings.

The earliest accounts provide little detail. In one account the Muslim forces are led by five kings (Life of St. Theotonius), while in another, they are under the command of one king, Ismar (Chronicles). In the more detailed Chronicle of the Goths, Ismar waited until Henriques penetrated into Muslim territory, then systematically sent his troops from Seville, Badajoz, Elvas, Évora, and Beja against the Portuguese count. It is thus possible that the five kings were actually the leaders of the Almoravid garrisons of each of the Andalusi cities, under the overall command of the Almoravid governor of Cordoba, Muhammad Az-Zubayr Ibn Umar. Further, the Portuguese forces were surrounded on the hilltop where they encamped, Ismar hosted knights, who were executed later by Henriques, and that the Muslim king escaped in defeat. Arabic and Spanish accounts do not clarify the circumstances, and they even confuse the issue, identifying the Ismar as, alternatively, Ismar Abuzicri or Ismar and Abuzicri, with later historians identifying Abu Zakariya, the governor of Santarém, as the protagonist. It is also likely that the numbers were inflated by the chroniclers from a large-scale raid to grand assault by Muslim forces.

Aftermath
Shortly after the battle, Afonso Henriques is said to have called for the first assembly of the estates-general of Portugal at Lamego, where he was given the crown from the Primate Archbishop of Braga, to confirm the Portuguese independence from the Kingdom of León. This was a patriotic falsification perpetuated by the clergy, nobility, and supporters who promoted the restoration of Portuguese sovereignty and the claims of John IV, after the Iberian Union. The documents that refer to the estates-general were "deciphered" by Cistercian monks from the Monastery of Alcobaça to perpetuate the myth and justify the legitimacy of the Portuguese crown in the 17th century. The author of this falsification was Oliveira Marques, and even in 1632 there were misgivings about the validity of the chronicler's account or the existence of the Cortes of Lamego The account continued to support the notion that a meeting of the Cortes occurred in the Church of Santa Maria de Almacave, in Lamego, in 1143. During this meeting, after being acclaimed by estates-general, Afonso Henriques accepted a group of laws on royal succession and excluded the Castilian line of kings from the Portuguese throne, made provisions for the nobility on justice and the independence of Portugal. However, even as Spanish jurists and diplomats later demonstrated that the document was not creditable, the Portuguese defended the authenticity of the account. Alexandre Herculano later recounted the patriotic re-imagining in his História de Portugal, which caused its own controversy, and was later perpetuated by the writings of Alfredo Pimenta (who defended the existence of the Cortes of Lamego).

In commemoration of the Battle of Ourique, the first Portuguese coat-of-arms appeared that included five small shields, to represent the five defeated Muslim kings (from one interpretation), which was later challenged by many authors.

Legend

Some years later, the idea of a miraculous intervention in the battle by Saint James in favor of the Portuguese appeared in the chronicles of the battle. As a consequence of Portuguese independence this legend was embellished with time to distance the Portuguese from Spanish devotional practices and beliefs. Later interpretations replaced Saint James with Saint George and, finally, with Jesus Christ.

In the legend, Henriques was visited before the battle by an old man who saw in a dream that Henriques would be victorious because God would intervene in his favour. He advised the nobleman to leave the encampment alone when he heard the bell of the local chapel. Riding off he was surprised by a ray of light that showed him (in one interpretation) the sign of the cross and Jesus Christ on a crucifix. Henriques knelt in its presence and heard the voice of Christ, who told him he would defeat the Almoravids, which he, through courage and his faith, succeeded the following day.

The legend of the miracle of the Battle of Ourique served thus as a political instrument to defend Portuguese independence as divine will. Yet, the legend, possibly earlier, knows its first known record in the early 15th century by the monks of the Monastery of Santa Cruz, during the battles between John and the Kingdom of Castile. Some modern authors claim that it is a creation of the monks, or forged by these, while not presenting evidence to support their theory, being, according to others, a long popular and royal belief tradition. The legend first appeared in the Crónica de Portugal de 1419 and was accepted as fact until Alexandre Herculano reexamined the event, judging it a "pious fraud", in his investigation in the middle of the 19th century.

See also

Siege of Lisbon
Timeline of Portuguese history

References

Citations

Sources
 
 
 .

External links

1139 in Europe
12th century in Portugal
Ourique 1139
Battles of the Reconquista
Battles involving the Almoravid dynasty
Conflicts in 1139
County of Portugal
12th century in Al-Andalus